Hal Price Headley  (December 19, 1888 – March 22, 1962) was an American owner and breeder of Thoroughbred racehorses and a founder of Keeneland who served as the race track's president from 1935 to 1951. He owned the 4,000 acre Beaumont Farm on Harrodsburg Road at the western edge of Lexington, Kentucky as well as the 15,000-acre Pinebloom Plantation in Baker County, Georgia.

Hal Price Headley was one of those profiled by racing historian Edward L. Bowen in his 2003 book Legacies of the Turf : A Century of Great Thoroughbred Breeders.

In 2018, Hal Price Headley was posthumously inducted into the National Museum of Racing and Hall of Fame as one of the "Pillars of the Turf". The honor is for those "who have made extraordinary contributions to Thoroughbred racing in a leadership or pioneering capacity at the highest national level."

References

External links
 Hal Price Headley 1888-1962 - Thoroughbred Park - Kentucky Historical Markers 

1888 births
1962 deaths
Princeton University alumni
American racehorse owners and breeders
American horse racing industry executives
United States Thoroughbred Racing Hall of Fame inductees
Farmers from Kentucky
Businesspeople from Lexington, Kentucky
20th-century American philanthropists
20th-century American businesspeople